Eduardo Schaerer Vera y Aragón (2 December 1873 – 12 November 1941) was a Swiss-Paraguayan businessman, publisher, and Liberal politician. He served as President of the Republic of Paraguay between 1912 and 1916.

Schaerer was succeeded by Manuel Franco on 15 August 1916. Ex-president Schaerer continued in public service as a senator in 1921 and founded the newspaper La Tribuna (The Tribune) in 1925.

Schaerer was born in Caazapá, on 2 December 1873 to Santiago Schaerer and Elizabeth Vera y Aragon. His father was a notable Swiss colonizer (from Vordemwald, Aargau), and the special character that distinguished Schaerer was inherited from him. Schaerer married to Matilde Heisecke (daughter of Christian Heisecke, a German diplomat and consul of the Austro-Hungarian Empire). She had seven children with him, including Arturo Schaerer Heisecke, director of La Tribuna after his father and a recipient of the Maria Moors Cabot Prize, a journalism award of the Columbia University, in 1953.

His life 
He completed his elementary education in his hometown, and high school education at the National High School of the Capital. From a young age he went into business, politics, and journalism. He was one of the founders of the newspaper El Diario with Gualberto Cardús, Adolfo Huerta, and Adolfo Riquelme, and founder of La Tribuna, a newspaper of his own property that was for over half a century the head of the national press. He died in Buenos Aires on 12 November 1941.

His government 
Eduardo Schaerer had been seen as the only one capable of guiding the country through the difficult circumstances that became apparent in the future. He assumed the presidency of the Republic from 15 August 1912 until 15 August 1916. His cabinet was composed of: Eusebio Ayala, Foreign Affairs; Manuel Gondra, War and Navy; Félix Paiva, Justice, Culture and Public Instruction; Gerónimo Zubizarreta, Finances and José P. Montero, Interior. There were some changes later: Gondra went to the chancery, Colonel Patricio A. Escobar War and Navy; Eusebio Ayala to Treasury, Culture and Public Instruction and Belisario Rivarola to Justice.

Works 
With his government began a period of political stability and economic prosperity that lasted nearly a decade. In 1912, Dr. Manuel Franco was appointed rector of the University. In 1913, the resignation of Dr. Teodosio González was accepted to his chair of Criminal Law. Simeon Carísimo was director of the National School of Villarrica, where Francisco Ruffinellis began to exert the chair of Geography.

It began operating the C.A.L.T. (predecessor of the A.N.D.E.), the first electric lighting system in the country, and the first telephone system and electric tram.

At the beginning of his administration, Paraguay had 180 km of railways that reached the city of Villarrica. In 1916 at the end of his government, they counted nearly 700 km of railways. In 1913, the railroads reached the city of Encarnacióm and assembled with the rail line enabling the city of Posadas, Argentina allowing the fast arrival of Paraguayan products to the Atlantic Ocean. The construction of a railway network began in the Department of Concepción that was intended to connect up with the Brazilian system and the new railway company Carlos Casado in the Chaco region. The construction of the branch to Abaí was of utmost importance, connecting Paraguay with Brazil and securing a stable route to the ocean for exporting products. Manuel Gondra with his ministers and Eusebio Ayala was the precursor to the development of this country and a new geopolitical concept for Paraguay. In this regard also, in 1915 he was presented the first study for the hydroelectric development of the Saltos del Guaira, precursor idea of the current Itaipu Dam.

In the urban sphere, during his tenure a new Municipal Organic Law, in Asuncion numerous public works began a period of major urban transformations were performed took effect.

During his administration, a new Municipal Organic Law came into force. There were carried out several public works, as improving public parks, street paving, demolition and relocation to the old central market, demolition of the former House of Governors, for opening a Centennial Walk.

In the educational field, by decree it included the learning of English in the secondary school curriculum. Villarrica, Encarnacion, Pillar, also in Barrero Grande: the first rural normal schools in three of the historic villas were created.

It was the first Paraguayan president since Carlos Antonio Lopez sent scholarship to Europe and United States. During his government sent more than 200 Paraguayans to important European universities, among which we can mention promising men like Silvio Pettirossi, Bruno Guggiari Nicolas Sarubbi, Tomas Romero Pereira, Pedro Ciancio, Pedro Calunga, Anselmo Jover Peralta and many others.

Defense regarding the aid was promoted to veterans and June 23, 1915 the Military Academy, which would be essential for the formation of a high-level military class would defend the Chaco years later was created.

In 1913 during his tenure, the former American President Theodore Roosevelt visited Paraguay.

In the Judiciary order Dr. Cecilio Báez was appointed to the Superior Court, Federico Chaves was appointed prosecutor of  crime and Luis Ruffinelli defender of poor inmates in 1914, and in August 1915 Dr. Enrique Bordenave assumed the general secretariat of the presidency. In the same year he adopted the curriculum of the School of Commerce and it was expanded the law of regulation of secondary and higher education.

The cultural situation of the country received a motivation encouraged by Don Manuel Gondra, the "thinking man", one of the most important intellectual men of that time. Schaerer signed the appointments of poets and artists, as Rubén Darío, Narciso Colmán, Leopoldo Jimenez Ramos, Eloy Fariña Núñez, Delfín Chamorro, Manuel Ortiz Guerrero, Modesto Delgado Rodas, Justo Pastor, Federico Garcia; among others.

One of the most significant things was the continuing numbers of laws, beginning in the year 1913. These are distinguished: the permission to rid the public post office of San Lorenzo Ñu Guazú in (1912); one in which is resolved the acquisition of materials for the Museum of Natural History in (1913) and another one that set the continuation of the reconstruction work of the Oratory (Pantheon of the Heroes).

On 1 January 1915 people in Asuncion were awakened in early hours by an uprising led by Freire Gomes Esteves and his brother, Luis Freire Esteves. As Colonel Manuel J. Duarte was absent, the military commanders were a captain, a lieutenant and a sergeant. They captured the president but the attempt failed.

Schaerer was the first civilian President who managed to complete his mandate without conspiracies or military uprisings.

Political biography 
In the year 1904 he was part of the main civilians leaders of the liberal insurgency, he acted in Our Lady of Pilar, Ñeembucú. Schaerer emerged as one of the signatories of the manifesto read “to the People”, on 4 July 1908, with which the "radical" group tried to justify the uprising that was planned by mayor Albino Jara. He was mayor of the municipality of Asunción between 5 July 1908 and 17 January 1911. He also served as Director of Customs, Minister of the Interior (1912) and Senator (1921). On 7 August of that year, he signed the invitation to participate in the assembly of that style, which took place on the 15th at the National Theatre, which at that time intended to "constitute a large ruling party."

Schaerer was the first civilian president who managed to finish its mandate without any hitting or military uprisings. He had an extremely important role in strengthening of institutions and the development of civil leader Paraguay and is remembered as one of the great builders of the Guarani nation.

He served as the President of the Senate in 1919-1920.

References

   (Presidency of the Republic of Paraguay) (in Spanish)
 "Paraguay's Former President Dies in Exile at 66." The New York Times 13 November 1941: 28.

1873 births
1941 deaths
People from Caazapá
Paraguayan people of Swiss descent
Liberal Party (Paraguay) politicians
Presidents of Paraguay
Presidents of the Senate of Paraguay
Paraguayan journalists
Male journalists
Paraguayan exiles